Hartland Four Corners is an unincorporated village in the town of Hartland, Windsor County, Vermont, United States. Hartland Four Corners has a post office with ZIP code 05049, which opened on July 5, 1854.

References

Unincorporated communities in Windsor County, Vermont
Unincorporated communities in Vermont